Miranda State is one of the 23 states of Venezuela and the second most populous after Zulia State. As of the 2011 census, it had a population of 2,675,165 residents. It also has the greatest Human Development Index in Venezuela, according to the Venezuelan National Institute of Statistics (Instituto Nacional de Estadistica, Caracas). The most recent population estimate was 3,194,390 in mid-2016.

Miranda is an important center for political, economic, cultural and commercial activities. The state is administered by a governor, and is sub-divided into 21 municipalities, each under a mayor.

History

Pre-Columbian history
When the Spanish arrived, the region was inhabited by various Caribbean tribes. Among them were the Caracas, the Teques, the Cumanagotos, the Mariches and the Quiriquires. The Teques inhabited the southwestern part of Guaire. The Mariches inhabited the eastern part of the Caracas Valley. They practiced hunting and gathering, while others lived by fishing. When the Spanish conquistadors arrived, these tribes were brave enough to fight for their territory, commanded by caciques like Guaicaipuro and Yare.

Spanish Colonization
Guaicaipuro was a legendary cacique of the Teques and Caracas Indians who resisted the conquistador Diego de Losada, while cacique Yare was the cumanagoto, quiriquire, charagoto and arauco chief who killed Captain Mendoza, who had murdered the Indian Tamanaco. Once all the tribes were subdued, the Spaniards settled completely on these lands, founding the city of Caracas, and later different towns in the interior of the state of Miranda.

During the colony this region became part of the Province of Caracas. At the end of the 16th century and beginning of the 17th century the highlands were used to cultivate, among other products, wheat destined largely for export to Cartagena de Indias and the Caribbean islands. From the second decade of the 17th century, cocoa displaced these crops. In addition, all commercial activities were monopolized by the Royal Guipuzcoa Company, which generated the first discontents and uprisings against the crown. From the beginning of the 17th century, slave labour quickly replaced the Indian labour force, concentrating on the Windward region, which was the largest cocoa producer. It was in this region that the first free blacks rose up against their masters, but were later stifled by Spanish troops.

19th Century
After the dissolution of Gran Colombia, Venezuela still used the provinces as a political-territorial organization, which had been used for a long time. Miranda, at that time, was part of a province. Between 1832 and 1855 the use of the province persisted due to the confusion generated by the existence of a state as a political division of the country.

The division by states did not appear in Venezuela in a concrete way until 1864, when about twenty states were founded which, in the following governments, would be reduced to nine, among these, the founded state of Guzmán Blanco, which by 1873 only covered the region of Aragua.

In 1881, the State of Guzmán Blanco expanded its territory to include the region of Miranda, among other nearby regions that were included as part of Guárico.

In 1889, the territory of the Guzmán Blanco State was again modified by the Constitution, and its size was reduced by excluding several regions of the country such as the region of Aragua, but renaming the State as Edo Miranda.

20th and 21st Centuries
In 1900, by decree of General Cipriano Castro, the state of Caracas was included in Miranda and Caracas was renamed Miranda State with the provisional capital in Santa Lucia. Then in 1901 the political-territorial space is modified again and the capital of the state becomes Petare, and in 1904 it is changed to Ocumare del Tuy.

In 1909 the last important modification was made, changing the capital to Los Teques.

In 1982, the municipality of Los Salias was founded through the Official Gazette of the State of Miranda.

In 1989, after the decentralization carried out by President Carlos Andrés Perez, Arnaldo Arocha was elected the first governor by popular vote.

By October 15, 2017, Héctor Rodríguez was elected governor of the State of Miranda, after facing Carlos Ocariz in an election.

Chronology

In 1568 the mayor of Caracas, Francisco de Infante, killed the cacique Guaicaipuro, representative of the indigenous resistance in Venezuela.
In 1572 another of the men who fought against the Spanish conquest, the cacique Tamanaco, was also killed by the conquistadors.
In 1580 a smallpox epidemic breaks out, brought from Guinea by the black slaves, which ends the life of 20,000 aborigines in three years.
In 1620 the process of founding new cities begins.
In 1812 the royalists offered freedom to black slaves who took up arms against the Republicans. A general rebellion by the blacks caused panic among the landowners and led to the fall of the regime.
In 1861, a wave of fighting broke out between the conservatives and the Feds.
In 1841, the Federal Constitution created Miranda as an autonomous entity.
In 1884, a plague of locusts swept through Miranda and, as the shade trees withered, ruined the coffee and cocoa plantations.
In 1886, the Venezuelan Central Railroad entered service.
In 1891 a new division of Miranda became part of the State of Guzmán Blanco, together with the provinces of Caracas, Aragua, Guarico and Nueva Esparta.
In 1891 the first census was taken, more than 165,000 people lived in the current cantons of Miranda.
In 1892, during the Legalist Revolution, various battles took place in the region between the forces of Joaquín Crespo and Raimundo Andueza Palacio.
In 1893 the state of Miranda was formed, with the territories of Caracas (with the current state of Miranda), Guárico and Nueva Esparta.
In 1894, the Great Venezuelan Railroad entered service.
In 1897 the Compañía Anónima Electricidad de Caracas founded two years before by the engineer Ricardo Zuloaga installed the first hydroelectric station known as "El Encantado" located between the towns of Petare and Guarenas, thus initiating the stage of electric lighting of the city of Caracas;
In 1899, the Mirandina territory was included in the province of Caracas.
In 1900, by decree of General Cipriano Castro, the state of Caracas was renamed the state of Miranda, with Santa Lucía as its provisional capital.
In 1901 a new territorial division was proclaimed that maintained the state of Miranda, with Petare as its capital.
In 1904 the state of Miranda was maintained, with the capital in Ocumare del Tuy.
In 1907 an iron bridge was built in Ocumare over the Tuy River, a remarkable work of engineering for the time.
In 1909 the state of Miranda was structured as it is today, but with its capital in Ocumare del Tuy, later Los Teques was designated the capital of the state.

In 1924 the first modern paper factory in Venezuela was installed in El Encantado.
In 1927, the Legislative Assembly orders that the capital of the state of Miranda be moved to Los Teques.
In 1948, according to the Law, the political-administrative division of Miranda State includes 10 districts and 35 municipalities.
In 1957 the thermoelectric plant of La Mariposa, destined to supply energy for the pumping of water to Caracas, is put into service.
In 1958, Guatopo National Park was declared.
In 1967, a 6.5 Richter scale earthquake occurred, leaving 240 dead, hundreds injured and great material losses.
On Dec. 5, the Legislative Assembly of Miranda State created the Independence district, with its capital in Santa Teresa del Tuy
In February 1989, general protests began to emerge in Guarenas due to the rise in public transport prices, which then spread to the whole country, degenerating into an uncontrolled wave of looting, called El Caracazo.
In 1992 the state of Miranda is organized in 21 municipalities and 55 parishes.
In 1999 heavy rains caused havoc in the region of El Guapo when the dam of the same name broke.
In 2000 four municipalities of Miranda were integrated into the Metropolitan District of Caracas, but still part of the state of Miranda.

Geography

Location
The state of Miranda is located in the north-central part of Venezuela. It is part of the so-called Capital Region together with the Capital District and the state of Vargas. It is located in the central coastal area of the country.

It borders on the north with the Federal District, on the south with the states of Guarico and Aragua, on the east with the Caribbean Sea and on the west with Aragua.
Relief
The relief is predominantly rugged and abrupt, with high slopes and narrow valleys within the mountains. The eastern sector constitutes a depression in the Serranía del Litoral. The Guaire River, which runs through the city of Caracas, divides the sector into two strips that are differentiated by their decline: the Valles del Tuy and La Depresión de Barlovento.

The waters that make up the hydrographic network of the state are mostly short course. The main river basin in the State is that of the River Tuy. The availability of water resources in the state is really precarious, as the state is located in the largest urban conglomerate in the country. The volume of available water is committed to supply almost the entire metropolitan district of Caracas, as well as the entire territory of Mirandina, which is poorly supplied by the reservoirs of La Mariposa, Lagartijo, La Pereza, Ocumarito, Agua Fría, Taguaza, El Guapo and Quebrada Seca. Many of the towns in the state are not frequently supplied with drinking water due to the high consumption of water resources. The Guaire, Tuy and Grande rivers are not used because they are in a state of contamination.

Hydrography
The hydrography of Miranda State is characterized by the short course and low flow of its rivers, with the exception of Tuy. This characteristic, combined with the settlement of the largest mass of population in the country, gives its rivers great significance as sources of water for urban consumption. The Tuy River, with a length of 250 km, rises at an altitude of 2 100 m, on the southern flank of the Litoral mountain range, flows eastwards through the Abra de Tácata to the Tuy and Barlovento valleys, and flows into the Caribbean Sea through the Paparo mouth. The El Jarillo River and the Aguas Frías and La Negra streams, tributaries of the Tuy on the left bank, have been dammed, near the Teques, in the Agua Fría reservoir, while the Ocumare, was dammed near Ocumare del Tuy, in the Ocumarito reservoir. The best known tributary is the Guaire River. On the right bank, the Tuy receives the Taguaza, Taguacita and Cuira rivers. Other important rivers are the Guarenas, Rio Grande or Caucagua, Capaya, El Guapo, Pacairigua, El Curiepe and Cúpira.

Climate
The climate of Miranda State is very hot in the low areas with temperatures ranging from 20 ℃ to 42 ℃ with very high humidity in the coastal region of Barlovento. In the Altos Mirandinos region, temperatures vary slightly throughout the year. In the dry season (December–March), temperatures vary between 10 ℃ and 23 ℃, in the beginning of the wet season (April, May) high temperatures can be registered up to 33 ℃, the rest of the year it varies between 16 ℃ and 25 ℃.

Soil
The state of Miranda has soils with a high agricultural vocation that have been used since colonial times for the cultivation of cocoa, fruits, vegetables, cereals and other subsistence crops. However, the pressure of urban and industrial activities, especially the settlement of high population concentrations, has meant a loss of very considerable agricultural areas in the Tuy Valleys, in the Guarenas and Guatire area, and in the Barlovento region.

Fauna
In mountainous areas, rivers and streams, it is common to see mammals such as the raccoon (Didelphis marsupialis) and the spiny rat (Proechimys sp.), the squirrel (Sciurus granatensis), the mountain buckthorn (Dasypus novemcinctus), the porcupine (Coendou prehensilis), the agouti (Dasyprocta leporina), the sloth (Bradypus tridactylus) very common in all areas of the municipality, the rabbit (Sylvilagus brasiliensis), and the one that has almost disappeared from the municipal area, the matacan deer (Mazama americana) that was common in the area of Turgua. In addition, at night it is common to observe bats, among which the list bat (Saccopteryx bilineata), common fruit bat (Artibeus jamaicensis), common vampire bat (Desmodus rotundus), and house bat (Molossus molossus) stand out. In the area of Los Carraos and Zuloaga caves, the insectivorous bat species Natalus tumidirostris, Myotis keaysi and Tadarida aurispinosa have been identified.

Flora
Among the common trees to find in the forest are, the ladle or child (Gyranthera caribensis), the bitter cedar (Cedrela mexicana), milky of the genus Sapium (Sapium stylare), yagrumo (Cecropia peltata), yagrumo male (Schefflera morototoni), bucare (Erythrina poeppigiana), ceiba (Ceiba pentandra), indio desnudo (Bursera simaruba); in some parts of the state the native flora has been intervened and replaced by fruit trees such as guamo (Inga fastuosa), mango (Mangifera indica), orange (Citrus × sinensis), mandarin (Citrus × tangerina), guava (Psidium guajava), pomarosa (Syzygium jambos), avocado (Persea americana) and cambur (Musa × paradisiaca).

In the urban area it is common to see different types of ornamental trees, among which we can highlight the eucalyptus (Eucalyptus camaldulensis), apamates (Tabebuia rosea), araguaneyes (Tabebuia chrysantha), mahoganies (Swietenia macrophylla), soaps (Hura crepitans), kujis (Acacia farnesiana), samans (Pithecellobium saman), bamboos (Bambusa vulgaris), riqui riquis (Heliconia latispatha) and tapir nails (Philodendron)

Politics and government
The state of Miranda (as a federal entity) has its own charter, the Constitution of the State of Miranda, which is the basis of the state's legal system and was approved in 2006. Its current governor is Hector Rodriguez.

Executive Power
The executive branch is composed of a governor and a council of secretaries who assist him in the management of government and are freely appointed and removable officials. The governor is elected by the people by direct and secret vote for a period of four years with the possibility of re-election for new periods, being in charge of the state administration.

Until 1988, the governor was appointed by the president of the republic. In 1989, the first direct regional elections were held in the country.

The current governor is Hector Rodriguez. He was elected on October 15, 2017 with 52.78% of the votes.

Legislative power
The Legislative Power is represented by the unicameral Legislative Council of the State of Miranda, elected by the people through a direct and secret vote every four years. They can be re-elected for new consecutive periods, under a system of proportional representation of the population of the state and its municipalities. The PSUV currently has 15 legislators and since the 2012 regional elections the PSUV has a majority of 8 legislators against 7 from the Democratic Unity Table. The President of the Legislative Council is Legislator Aurora Morales and the Vice President is Legislator Miguel Mora .

Police
Miranda State has its own autonomous police force based on Article 164 of the 1999 Venezuelan Constitution, which is known as Polimiranda (Miranda State Police), created in 1996 as the Autonomous Police Institute of Miranda State. Its current director is Major General Regulo Argotte Prieto.

Administrative divisions 

The State of Miranda as a federal entity with constitutional rank has its own Constitution, (Constitución del Estado Miranda, the Constitution of the State of Miranda) and it has two branches of public power according to Article 14 of its Constitution: the Executive (Governor of Miranda) and the Legislative (Legislative Council). In addition, autonomous bodies such as the State Comptroller's Office and the Attorney General's Office are established. The other three depend on the National Power as the Judicial (Miranda State Judicial District), Electoral (Miranda State Electoral Office) and Citizen.

Its authorities are elected by the Mirandina people in a universal, direct and secret way, sending 13 deputies to the National Assembly of Venezuela.

The state of Miranda is divided into 21 municipalities and 55 parishes according to the Regional and National Constitution.

Municipalities and municipal seats

Miranda State is sub-divided into 21 municipalities, given below with their administrative centres, areas and populations:

Other important towns

 Aragüita
 Araira
 Capaya
 Cartanal
 Cumbo
 Curiepe
 El Café
 El Clavo
 El Guapo
 La Democracia
 Laguna de Tacarigua
 Las Brisas
 Machurucuto

 Marizapa
 Minas de Baruta
 Nueva Cúa
 Panaquire
 Paparo
 Paracotos
 San Antonio de Yare
 San José de Río Chico
 San Pedro de los Altos
 Tacarigua de Mamporal
 Tácata
 Tapipa

Demographics

Race and ethnicity 

According to the 2011 Census, the racial composition of the population was:

Economy 

The economic development of the state is based on the excellence of its soils, which has allowed the boom in agriculture. The region of the valleys of Tuy is characterized by the production of cocoa, sugar cane, and corn, among other crops. Barlovento also has great fertility of its lands, standing out the cultivation of cocoa and a great variety of fruits and vegetables. Likewise, Guatire and Guarenas have good lands for cultivation, being coffee one of the main products of the area.

Among other economic activities is the industrial one, standing out the manufacturing one, which conforms together with the one of the Federal District the first urban manufacturing set of the country.

The tertiary sector is extremely important: financial, commercial and service activities are concentrated in the area of Miranda. During the last two decades the tourist activity has grown with the installation of a great hotel infrastructure in the coast of Barlovento.

Cereals are grown in the fertile valleys of Tuy, while the microclimates are used for horticultural and fruit activities whose products are processed in the agro-industries.

In suburban areas, poultry and pig farming are practiced, especially promoted by Portuguese, Spanish and Italian immigrants.

Coffee production has decreased; however, the expansion of sugar cane and cotton crops in the Tuy Valley continues. Since colonial times there have been cocoa plantations in Barlovento combined with cassava, yams, caraotas or beans and bananas.

The industrialization process had an important economic impact, favored by its proximity to the city of Caracas, mainly in the cities of Petare, Guarenas and Guatire and in the valley of Tuy, where manufacturing centers of the metal-mechanical, chemical and food sectors were established. This led to a major urban boom, which caused a decrease in the amount of agricultural land.

Main Products

Agriculture: Cocoa, fruits, vegetables, coconut, yucca, cereals, flowers.
Breeding: Poultry, cattle and pigs.
Fishing: Tuna, mackerel, lebranche, mullet and bass (marimos). Shrimp and crab (crustaceans). Squid, chipichipi, guacuco, oyster and octopus (mollusks).
Industrial: Metalworking, chemical and food products, alcoholic and soft drinks, graphic arts, textiles, footwear.

Tourism

The state is well known for its green areas (including several national parks, haciendas and protected areas), for its highly urbanized cities that coexist with rural towns, for the coasts of the Caribbean Sea, a safe stop during vacation seasons, the Devils of Yare and the Tacarigua Lagoon; just to mention some of the tourist attractions of the region that is visited annually by thousands of seasonal visitors.

It has large shopping centers, in the east of the metropolitan area of Caracas, for the enjoyment of the population, in the high mirandinos is La Cascada Commercial City, of large dimensions that has food fairs, cinemas, large stores, and all kinds of services and bank agencies, Additionally, in the professional center La Cascada is the high mirandine headquarters of the SENIAT, also near Los Teques is the town of San Pedro de Los Altos, an agricultural town, where vegetables and large areas of flower crops are grown, and several bottling plants for mineral water such as Minalba and Zenda where pure spring water is bottled.

It also highlights its architecture ranging from modern Chacao to the colonial architecture of many villages, highlighting in that aspect the many museums, cathedrals and historic churches it has. It also has a diversity of monuments, urban parks, viewpoints, theaters, among many other spaces for the enjoyment of visitors.

Natural Heritage
The state of Miranda has monuments and natural heritage because of its incredible beauty, some of these are

Birongo.
The El Jarillo Village.
Higuerote.
Natural Monument Alfredo Jahn Cave.
Natural Monument Pico Codazzi.
Indian Cave Park.
National Park El Ávila.
Guatopo National Park.
Laguna de Tacarigua National Park
Macarao National Park.
Carenero Beach.
Chirimena Beach
Barlovento Beach.
Beaches of Buche and Los Totumos
French Port.

Built heritage
The state of Miranda has a varied architectural heritage:

Our Lady of Candelaria Chapel 
 Arturo Michelena House
Bolivar Museum House
Cecilio Acosta Cultural Complex (includes the Los Teques Athenaeum, the Cecilio Acosta Central Library and the Emma Soler Amphitheatre).
Tito Salas Contemporary Art Gallery Foundation.
San Benito Cultural Diversity Center in Santa Lucia
Make the rosary.
Hacienda El Volcán
Mediagua Estate.
Augustin Codazzi Aquarium

San Felipe Neri Cathedral Church
Church of Carmen.
Our Lady of Mount Carmel Church.
Santa Lucia del Tuy Parish Church.
St. Teresa of Jesus Parish Church.
Sweet Name of Jesus Parish Church

Our Lady of Copacabana Parish Cathedral
Our Lady of the Rosary Parish Church in Baruta.
Our Lady of the Rosary Parish Church of Cua.
St. Rose of Lima Parish Church
San Diego de Alcalá Church.
St. Joseph Church in Barlovento.
St. Joseph of Chacao Church
Sanctuary of Betania
Mirador the Butterfly
Mirador San José de los Altos
Lookout Down The Lighthouse El Cuji
Drummonument
Devil's Monument.
Monument Virgen del Carmen.
Monument of Saint Lucia, Virgin and Martyr.
Antonio María Piñate Museum.
Cristobal Rojas Museum.
Popular Art Museum of Petare.
White Linen Museum.
El Encanto Train.
Main Railway Station in Santa Teresa del Tuy.
Old Bridge of Santa Teresa del Tuy.
ICET Murano Art Factory founded by Bruno Ara in 1957

Transport

Central Ezequiel Zamora Railway System (Caracas - Cúa Line):8 has 4 stations (Caracas, Charallave Norte, Charallave Sur, Cúa) and has a length of 41.4 km².
Subway system:

Los Teques Subway: inaugurated in 2006. It has 5 stations: Las Adjuntas (belonging to Metro de Caracas), Ayacucho, Ali primera, guaicaipuro and independencia
Caracas Metro
Surface roads: the most important are the Francisco Fajardo Highway, Prados del Este Highway and Boyacá Avenue (Cota mil). It also has roads that connect several towns within the state, as well as outside of it.

Education

Universities
Santa Maria University.
Simón Bolívar University.
Metropolitan University.
Nueva Esparta University.
Simón Rodíguez National Experimental University
Andrés Bello Catholic University, Núcleo Los Teques.
National Experimental University of the Armed Forces
Venezuelan Institute for Scientific Research (IVIC)
PDVSA Intevep.
Villa del Cine

Culture

Palmeros de Chacao
The tradition of the Palmeros de Chacao dates back to the Venezuelan colonial period in 1770, when the parish priest José Antonio Mohedano decided, in the form of a promise, to ask God for mercy due to an epidemic of yellow fever that existed in Caracas at the time. Coming from the haciendas near El Avila National Park, Mohedano sent a group of workers to bring down leaves from the Royal Palm to commemorate Jesus' entry into Jerusalem.

Nowadays, the Palmeros go up every Friday of the Council (the Friday before Palm Sunday) and come down the following Saturday with the palm leaves that will be blessed during the Sunday celebration. The palms are collected from a sector called Cueva de los Palmeros by the entrance of Sabas Nieves. Once blessed, the palms are distributed among the believers, who braid, crush and transform them into crosses that they keep in their homes as a sign of faith.

Diablos Danzantes de Yare
The Diablos Danzantes de Yare is a religious festival celebrated in San Francisco de Yare, Miranda State (Venezuela), on Corpus Christi Day, carried out by the "Sociedades del Santísimo Sacramento". The festival is a local version of the dancing devils of Corpus Christi.

Its origin dates back to the 18th century, being this the oldest brotherhood in the American continent and the largest in the world. The fraternity of devils is divided into a hierarchical order, represented in their masks.

Every Thursday of Corpus Christi (9 Thursdays after Holy Thursday) there is a ritual dance of the so-called dancing devils, where they worship the Blessed Sacrament of the Altar and celebrate the triumph of good over evil.

Festival of San Juan de Curiepe
is an Afro-descendant celebration held in the town of Curiepe, in the State of Miranda in Venezuela. It commemorates the image of Saint John the Baptist, with a series of music and dance rituals that take place from midnight on June 23 to the evening of June 25th each year. San Juan is one of the festivities that gathers more devotees throughout the country, being the manifestation of Curiepe one of the best known in the nation.

Parranda of San Pedro
It is a popular and religious festivity that is celebrated every June 29 in the cities of Guatire and Guarenas in the State of Miranda, Venezuela. It has its origin in the Colonial Period. It consists of some parranderos, dressed in levita and pumpá (one of them carries the image of the saint, another carries a yellow and red flag) and accompanied by Cuatro and Maracas. The percussion is achieved with some pieces of animal leather tied to the feet like sandals (called cotizas). They are also accompanied by two impoverished children, dressed in a red and yellow suit (similar to harlequins), who are known as "tucusitos".

Holy Cross of Pacairigua
Religious image that is kept in the parish temple of the city of Guatire, Miranda state, Venezuela and that constitutes since the early seventeenth century the religious patron of that city. The cross, made of cedar wood, covered with white paint and gold edges, is two meters high. It is taken out in procession every year on May 3, the Day of the May Cross at the Catholic Santoral.

Media

Television
Several channels are based in this entity, such as: Mira Tv, Telemir, Venezolana de Televisión  (the main television channel of the Venezuelan state), Televen, La Tele, Canal i, and Telesur (the main international news channel based in Venezuela). Channels from other states or countries are also transmitted, such as Globovisión and Venevisión.

Radio
There are several radio stations, and you can also get the signal from other radio stations in Aragua and Guarico state. Currently in Los Altos Mirandinos there are, for some time, several radio stations in FM: Latina 98.7 FM (Tropical), La Cima 96.7 FM (Tropical), Miranda 100.1 FM (Tropical), Ciudad 106.1 FM (Tropical), Antena 103.7 (Anglo Hispano), Melao 104.1 FM (Tropical), Panamericana 90.7 (Popular), Frecuencia Feeling 97.1 (Adulto Contemporáneo) among others, but the main ones and with more power are those of Caracas that in their majority have their transmitting plants in the Avila hill, and thanks to this commonly can be listened in great part of the extensive state of Miranda.

Written press
Among the newspapers published in the area are the daily Avance de Los Teques, La Voz de Guarenas and La Región, which covers the Alto Mirandinos, the metropolitan area, Guarenas and Guatire, also in the Valles del Tuy circulates the daily Noticias del Tuy. Other regional newspapers include "Avance" and Ciudad Petare (in that Caracas parish). In this state is also the headquarters of El Nacional newspaper, one of the most important in the country.

Sports

Sports Clubs
  Football: Petare Fútbol Club (Venezuelan First Division)
  Football: Atlético Sucre Club de Fútbol (Third Division of Venezuela)
  Indoor Football: Los Teques Futsal Club (Venezuelan Indoor Soccer League)
  Volleyball: Vikings of Miranda (Venezuelan Volleyball League)
  Basketball: Panteras de Miranda (Venezuelan Professional Basketball League)
  Basketball: Industriales de Guarenas (National Basketball League)
  Basketball: Bushido de Los Teques (National Basketball League)
  Basketball: Barlovento (National Basketball League)
  Basketball: Unión Ferrocarril del Tuy (National Basketball League)
  Baseball: Cacaoteros de Miranda (Bolivarian National Baseball League)
  Rugby: Universidad Metropolitana Rugby Club (Venezuelan Rugby Club Championship)
  Rugby: Simón Bolívar University Rugby Club (Venezuelan Rugby Club Championship)

Sports Facilities
Arnaldo Arocha Sports Center Located in Los Teques, Capacity of 3,000 spectators.
José Joaquín Papá Carrillo Gymnasium Located in Los Dos Caminos, Capacity of 3,500 spectators.
Fray Luis de Leon Sports Complex
Simón Bolívar University Football Stadium

Notable people
 Ehire Adrianza - MLB player for the Minnesota Twins
 Luis Enrique Oberto, politician
 Miguel Pérez, baseball player

See also 

 Francisco de Miranda
 States of Venezuela

References

External links 
 Information about the region of the Tuy Valley
 Notices about the region of Barlovento at Barloventoardiente.com
 Guatire.net
 Guarenas.com

 
States of Venezuela
States and territories established in 1909